Dimo Bakalov (born 19 December 1988) is a Bulgarian professional footballer who plays as a winger for Lokomotiv Sofia.

Career
In 2006 the Youth Academy midfielder Dimo Bakalov agreed the conditions of his first professional contract with Sliven 2000, which was to be effective for three years.

In June 2014, Bakalov moved from Ludogorets Razgrad to Beroe Stara Zagora. He returned to Ludogorets in the summer of 2018. In July 2020, Bakalov once again signed with Beroe Stara Zagora.

Club statistics

Honours

Club 
Ludogorets
 A Group (5): 2011–12, 2012–13, 2013–14, 2018–19, 2019–20
 Bulgarian Cup (2): 2011–12, 2013–14
 Bulgarian Supercup (2): 2012, 2019

References

External links
Profile at Soccerway

Bulgarian footballers
1988 births
Living people
OFC Sliven 2000 players
PFC Ludogorets Razgrad players
PFC Beroe Stara Zagora players
PFC Lokomotiv Plovdiv players
FC Tsarsko Selo Sofia players
FC Lokomotiv 1929 Sofia players
First Professional Football League (Bulgaria) players
Association football midfielders
Sportspeople from Sliven